The Atomic Trades and Labor Council (ATLC) is a labor union umbrella organization, affiliated with the Metal Trades Department of the AFL–CIO, that serves as the bargaining unit representing about 2,100 workers employed by U.S. Department of Energy contractors at Oak Ridge National Laboratory and the Y-12 National Security Complex in Oak Ridge, Tennessee.

The ATLC was established in 1946 and was certified by the National Labor Relations Board on September 25, 1946, as the bargaining unit for Oak Ridge National Laboratory employees located at the X-10 site. It was certified to represent Y-12 employees in 1951.

The ATLC's members belong to 16 international unions and 17 local unions, including:
 International Association of Heat and Frost Insulators and Asbestos Workers Local 52
 Service Employees International Union Local 166
 International Brotherhood of Boilermakers, Iron Ship Builders, Blacksmiths, Forgers and Helpers Local 453
 United Brotherhood of Carpenters and Joiners Local 50
 International Chemical Workers Union Council of the United Food and Commercial Workers Local 715c / Local 252c
 UNITE HERE Local 623
 International Brotherhood of Electrical Workers Local 760
 International Association of Fire Fighters Local I-2
 International Association of Machinists and Aerospace Workers Local 480
 International Union of Operating Engineers Local 900
 International Brotherhood of Painters and Allied Trades of the United States and Canada Local 1805
 United Association of Journeymen and Apprentices of the Plumbing and Pipe Fitting Industry of the United States and Canada Local 718
 International Association of Bridge, Structural, Ornamental and Reinforcing Iron Workers Local 384
 Sheet Metal Workers International Association Local 5
 International Brotherhood of Teamsters Local 519
 Operative Plasterers' and Cement Masons' International Association of the United States and Canada Local 78

ATLC currently has a four-year contract, from April 2009 through April 2013, with UT-Battelle that covers work at Oak Ridge National Laboratory. Its current contract with B&W Y-12, covering workers at Y-12, extends through June 22, 2013.

See also

Labor unions in the United States

References

External links
 ATLC web site

AFL–CIO
National trade union centers of the United States
Oak Ridge National Laboratory
Trade unions established in 1946